Aldo Sebastián Corzo Chávez (born 20 May 1989) is a Peruvian professional footballer who plays as right-back for Club Universitario de Deportes and the Peru national team.

Playing style
Corzo mainly plays at right back and is naturally right-footed, but he can also play at left back. He is known for his great stamina, his strong willingness to help in the attack, and his aggressive style of defending. He also has good speed and control of the ball.

Club career

Alianza Lima
Corzo got to Alianza Lima after playing for Club de Regatas Lima when Jaime Duarte saw him. He was promoted to the first team in 2008 by Richard Páez. He made his official debut against Sport Boys in Matute. After that match Corzo was a regular in the initial 11, being an important key and saving Alianza from playing in the second division.

Universidad San Martin
On 7 January 2010 signed a two years contract for Universidad San Martín de Porres.

International career
He was part of the Peru U-20 team in the 2009 South American Youth Championship, being eliminated quickly by losing four games.

On 2 February 2009, he was called to the senior team by the then current coach Jose 'Chemo' del Solar to play a friendly against El Salvador losing 1–0.

In June 2011, the new Peruvian national team coach Sergio Markarian decided to give Corzo a chance to play in a friendly against Senegal. The friendly took place on 28 June 2011 in Lima, and it was the last friendly before the start of the Copa América. Corzo played the entire match against Senegal which finished in a 1–0 victory in favor of Peru.

2011 Copa America
His consistent performances convinced Markarian to include him in Peru's squad for the 2011 Copa América. He made his Copa America debut by starting against Chile in the group stage. Despite the loss, Corzo put in a strong performance at left back by not allowing Chile, with Alexis, to score. His second game in the Copa America was against Venezuela in the third-place match. Corzo again played from the start of the match and gave another solid performance this time at right back. In the end, he helped Peru claim the Bronze medal by winning the match 4–1. This is (coupled with the 2015 Copa América) Peru's best result in the Copa America since they last won Gold in 1975.

2018 World Cup
In May 2018, he was named in Peru’s provisional 24 man squad for the 2018 World Cup in Russia.

Career statistics

International
Statistics accurate as of match played on 28 January 2022.

Honours

Club
Universidad San Martín
Torneo Descentralizado: 2010

Country
Peru national team
Copa América: Bronze medal 2011

Individual
 Torneo Descentralizado Right-back of the Year: 2009

Personal life
Corzo studies currently Administration in Business at Universidad San Ignacio de Loyola.

References

External links

1989 births
Living people
Footballers from Lima
Peruvian footballers
Peru international footballers
Peruvian Primera División players
Club Alianza Lima footballers
Club Deportivo Universidad de San Martín de Porres players
Deportivo Municipal footballers
Association football fullbacks
2011 Copa América players
Copa América Centenario players
2018 FIFA World Cup players
2019 Copa América players
2021 Copa América players